Labajin Bridge is a  concrete beam bridge near Yingjing in Sichuan, China. , it is among the sixty highest bridges in the world. The bridge is located on G5 Beijing–Kunming Expressway.

See also
List of highest bridges in the world
List of tallest bridges in the world

References

Bridges in Sichuan
Bridges completed in 2012